The Freebooter of the Baltic (1857) is an early novel by the Swedish romantic novelist Viktor Rydberg. The adventure is set in 17th century Sweden and is a swashbuckling tale of piracy on the high seas, with political overtones. Several historical people are portrayed in the book, such as Bengt Skytte, Maria Skytte, Christina Anna Skytte and Gustav Skytte. 

The novel was translated into English by Caroline L. Broomall in 1891.

External links
 Text of the novel at Project Runeberg 

1857 Swedish novels
Adventure novels
Novels about pirates
Novels set in Sweden
Novels set in the 17th century
Novels set in the Baltic Sea
Swedish-language novels
Swedish historical novels